Hornsyld is a minor Danish town located between Hedensted and Juelsminde. It has a population of 1,634 (1st January 2022). Due to the amalgamation of municipalities in 2007 Hornsyld became a part of Hedensted Municipality.

Hornsyld has a lot of industry in proportion to its size. Companies as Triax, Hornsyld Købmandsgaard, EM Fiberglas and Dan-Hill-Plast are deep-rooted in the town.

References

Cities and towns in the Central Denmark Region
Hedensted Municipality